Mohammed Al-Ahmad Kuwait Naval Base is a Kuwaiti Navy base on the eastern coast of Kuwait. It is named after Mohammed Ahmad Al-Jaber Al-Sabah, the first Defense Minister of Kuwait. The base is also used by the United States Army, Navy and Coast Guard. A main deployment group of the US Navy the United States Fifth Fleet using the name Camp Patriot, It is used by US Military and Kuwaiti Forces to conduct military operations and training exercises.

The naval base also has a heliport with the ICAO designator OKNB.

See also

Chief of the General Staff (Kuwait)
History of the United States Marine Corps

References

Naval installations
Military of Kuwait
Military installations of the United States in Kuwait